Rami Grossberg is a full professor of mathematics at Carnegie Mellon University and works in model theory.

Work
Grossberg's work in the past few years has revolved around the classification theory of non-elementary classes. In particular, he has provided, in joint work with Monica VanDieren, a proof of an upward "Morley's Categoricity Theorem" (a version of Shelah's categoricity conjecture) for Abstract Elementary Classes with the amalgamation property, that are tame. In another work with VanDieren, they also initiated the study of tame Abstract Elementary Classes. Tameness is both a crucial technical property in categoricity transfer proofs and an independent notion of interest in the area – it has been studied by Baldwin, Hyttinen, Lessmann, Kesälä, Kolesnikov, Kueker among others.
Other results include a best approximation to the main gap conjecture for AECs (with Olivier Lessmann), identifying AECs with JEP, AP, no maximal models and tameness as the uncountable analog to Fraïssé's constructions (with VanDieren), a stability spectrum theorem and the existence of Morley sequences for those classes (also with VanDieren).
In addition to this work on the Categoricity Conjecture, more recently, with Boney and Vasey, new understanding of frames in AECs and forking (in the abstract elementary class setting) has been obtained.

Some of Grossberg's work may be understood as part of the big project on Saharon Shelah's outstanding categoricity conjectures:

Conjecture 1. (Categoricity for ).  Let  be a sentence. If  is categorical in a cardinal  then  is categorical in all cardinals .  See Infinitary logic and Beth number.

Conjecture 2. Let K be an AEC. There exists a cardinal μ(K) such that categoricity in a cardinal greater than μ(K) implies categoricity in all cardinals greater than μ(K). Furthermore, μ(K) is the Hanf number of K.

Examples of his results in applications to algebra include the finding that under the weak continuum hypothesis there is no universal object in the class of uncountable locally finite groups (answering a question of Macintyre and Shelah); with Shelah, showing that there is a jump in cardinality of the abelian group Extp(G, Z) at the first singular strong limit cardinal.

Personal life
Grossberg married his former doctoral student and frequent collaborator, Monica VanDieren.

References

External links 
 Rami Grossberg
 
 
 A survey of recent work on AECs

Year of birth missing (living people)
Living people
Israeli mathematicians
20th-century American mathematicians
21st-century American mathematicians
Carnegie Mellon University faculty
Model theorists